Crimean referendum may refer to:

1991 Crimean sovereignty referendum, on whether to re-establish the Crimean Autonomous Soviet Socialist Republic
1994 Crimean referendum, on whether voters were in favour of greater autonomy within Ukraine
2014 Crimean referendum, on whether Crimea should join Russia or remain part of Ukraine